The Catalan Coastal Depression, is a natural depression between the Catalan Pre-Coastal Range and the Mediterranean Sea. It is part of the Catalan Mediterranean System.

Geography
The Catalan Coastal Depression runs roughly in a NE-SW direction along parts of the following comarques: Empordà, Gironès, Selva, Maresme, Vallès, Barcelonès, Baix Llobregat, Penedès, Tarragonès, Baix Camp and Baix Ebre.

The Catalan Coastal Depression is about 300 km long and 20 km wide on average Some of the main Catalan cities are located in this area.

Ecology
Much of the surface of the Catalan Coastal Depression is subject to severe land degradation, owing mainly to urban sprawl.

See also
Catalan Coastal Range
 Catalan Pre-Coastal Range

References

External links
La formació d'un paisatge: el procés d'especialització vitícola a la Catalunya Prelitoral
Publications related to the Catalan Coastal Depression

Landforms of Catalonia
Valleys of Spain